Ivivva Athletica is a youth brand which was founded by lululemon athletica in 2009. Ivivva was created by lululemon in order to cater to a younger demographic and focuses on creating athletic sportswear for girls ages 6–14. The company launched with its first store in Vancouver, Canada in December 2009, and had over 70 stores and pop-up shop locations across Canada and the United States. In 2012, ivivva opened its first American stores in New York, Chicago, Boston, Bellevue and Orange County. Ivivva’s clothes are designed for athletic pursuits such as dance, running, yoga, ice skating, gymnastics, and on-the-court sports.

In June 2017, Lululemon Athletica announced the closures of many ivivva stores and focusing on the ivivva brand online. There are four standalone ivivva stores in the US and three in Canada, as of January 2019.

References 

Sportswear brands
Retail companies established in 2009